Warning (stylized in all caps) is the second extended play by South Korean singer Sunmi. It was released on September 4, 2018, by Makeus Entertainment. It is her first solo Korean material since the release of Full Moon in February 2014. "Gashina" was released as the lead single.

Background and release
On August 22, 2017, Sunmi released her third single "Gashina", which became her first release since the disbandment of Wonder Girls and the expiration of her contract with JYP Entertainment. The song was a commercial success and topped the Gaon Digital Chart, selling over 1,100,000 digital downloads as of December 2017. Her fourth single "Heroine" was released on January 18, 2018 and peaked at number 2 on Gaon Digital Chart. It was produced by The Black Label, marking her second collaboration with the YG-owned label after "Gashina". 

On July 11, it was reported that Sunmi has officially began working on her new album. In response to the reports, her agency MAKEUS Entertainment confirmed that she is preparing for a comeback aimed for September. On August 20, Sunmi's agency revealed the first teaser for her new album Warning on Twitter along with the release date set for September 4. On August 26, the tracklist of Warning was released via official social media channels of Make Us Entertainment. "Siren" was released on September 4, along with the EP and music video. It topped the Gaon Digital Chart, becoming Sunmi's second number one on the chart. In support of the EP, Sunmi embarked on her first solo world tour visiting cities in North America, Asia and Europe.

Track listing

Accolades

Charts

Weekly charts

Monthly charts

Sales

Release history

References

2018 EPs
Dance-pop EPs
Korean-language EPs
Sunmi EPs